Kenneth Christopher McKinstry (February 12, 1967 – January 23, 2006) was a researcher in artificial intelligence. He led the development of the MISTIC project which was launched in May 1996.  He founded the Mindpixel project in July 2000, and closed it in December 2005. McKinstry's AI work and similar early death dovetailed with another contemporary AI researcher, Push Singh and his MIT Open Mind Common Sense Project.

Life
McKinstry was a Canadian citizen. Born in Winnipeg, he resided several years in Chile. From 1999, he lived in Antofagasta as a VLT operator for the European Southern Observatory. At the end of 2004, he moved back to Santiago, Chile. Suffering from bipolar disorder, McKinstry had an armed standoff with police in Toronto in 1990, with it lasting 7 1/2 hours. It ultimately concluded with McKinstry being hit with tear gas, but ending with no casualties 

In February 1997, Chris McKinstry started an online soap opera, CR6. According to journalist Bartley Kives, around 700 people auditioned for the show, which only lasted for two months, before McKinstry left Winnipeg with "estimated debts in excess of $100,000". McKinstry later claimed to have lost $1 million in the CR6 failure, and the many people he recruited to build the soap opera, including photographers, writers, a director, and several prominent businesses, never received any of the money owed to them for their work.

Before his death, McKinstry designed an experiment with two cognitive scientists to study the dynamics of thought processes using data from his Mindpixel project. This work has now been published in Psychological Science in its January 2008 issue, with McKinstry as posthumous first author.

Mental health 
Chris McKinstry had a long struggle with his mental health, with him admitting to being diagnosed with bipolar disorder.  McKinstry, as a result, suffered from frequent suicidal thoughts and a long-standing depression, discussing it in his suicide note. In his teen years, McKinstry had attempted suicide, intentionally overdosing on drugs, another issue McKinstry struggled with.  His bipolar disorder is often attributed to the reason for his standoff in 1990.

Death

Chris McKinstry was found dead in his apartment on January 23, 2006, with a plastic bag over his head, connected by a hose from the stove gas line. He was found to have posted a suicide note online. McKinstry wrote, "I am tired of feeling the same feelings and experiencing the same experiences. It is time to move on and see what is next if anything...This Louis Vuitton, Prada, Montblanc commercial universe is not for me. If only I was loved as much a Montblanc pen..."'

There was some public note of the similarity between the suicide of Chris McKinstry and that of Push Singh, another AI researcher, a little over a month later. Both of their AI projects, McKinstry's Mindpixel project and Singh's MIT-backed Open Mind Common Sense, had similar trajectories over the last six years. His death was determined to have been suicide.

In media
McKinstry is the subject of a 2010 documentary called The Man Behind the Curtain which recounts his innovative work and his struggle with mental health issues.

Articles
"Minimum Intelligent Signal Test: An Alternative Turing Test", Canadian Artificial Intelligence, No.41.
"A Closer Look at Life in the Summer of '76", Mindjack, 2001.
"Passage through science", Mindjack, 2001.
"Twenty Twenty: Astronomical Vision", Mindjack, 2002.
"A Hacker Goes to Iraq", 2600: The Hacker Quarterly, 2003.

References

External links

Artificial intelligence researchers
People from Winnipeg
Canadian psychedelic drug advocates
Suicides by gas
1967 births
2006 suicides
People with bipolar disorder
2006 deaths